Svetlana Viktorovna Bessarab (born 7 December 1970, Krasnodar) is a Russian political figure and deputy of the 7th and 8th State Duma convocations.

In 1999 Bessarab graduated from the Moscow Technical University of Communications and Informatics, and in 2001 she received an MA degree from the Krasnodar University of the Ministry of Internal Affairs of Russia (Jurisprudence).  She started her political career in 2012 when she ran for the Legislative Assembly of the Krasnodar Krai. In 2013 was appointed the chairman of the Kuban branch of the All-Russia People's Front.

Since 2016 she has served as deputy of the  7th (2016-2021) and 8th State Duma (since 2021) convocations. She represents the Krasnodar Krai.

She was one of the initiators of the law on life imprisonment for pedophiles, adopted by the State Duma and signed by Vladimir Putin at the beginning of 2022.

On 24 March 2022, the United States Treasury sanctioned her in response to the 2022 Russian invasion of Ukraine.

References

1970 births
Living people
People from Krasnodar
United Russia politicians
21st-century Russian politicians
Seventh convocation members of the State Duma (Russian Federation)
Eighth convocation members of the State Duma (Russian Federation)
Russian individuals subject to the U.S. Department of the Treasury sanctions